Lucile Plane State Jail is a Texas Department of Criminal Justice state jail for women located in unincorporated Liberty County, Texas. The facility, on an approximately  plot of land, is co-located with the Hightower Prison Unit and the Henley State Jail. Plane is designed to hold 2,144 prisoners. Plane, the first women's state jail to be opened in Texas, was dedicated in June 1995.

Conditions
Plane State Jail is one of the many Texas State jails under scrutiny for inhumane care and deficient medical support for prison population. Federal Judge has ordered TDCJ to install air conditioning. TDCJ has been slow to comply.

Notable prisoners
 Laura Hall, perpetrator of the murder of Jennifer Cave
 Lisa Warzeka, one perpetrator of the 1999 Kingwood robbery incidents
 Alexandria Vera, Texas teacher, 24, who had sex repeatedly with her 13-year-old student and got pregnant with his child currently serving 10 years.
 Stephanie Raleen Forbes, Texas Teacher convicted of having an improper relationship with a student and sexual assault of a child.

References

External links

 Plane Unit

Prisons in Liberty County, Texas
1995 establishments in Texas